The Woman Between may refer to:

 The Woman Between (1931 American film)
 The Woman Between (1931 British film)